Forensix is an album by the death metal band Desecration. It was their first album to be released on Metal Age Productions and to include Andi Morris on bass guitar.

Track listing

Personnel
Desecration
Andi Morris - Bass, Backing vocals
Michael Hourihan - Drums
Ollie Jones - Vocals, Guitar

Production
Nick Hemingway - Recording, Mixing, Mastering
Jumali Katani - Artwork
Dave MacLean - Layout

2008 albums
Desecration (band) albums